The 2002 Fareham Council election took place on 2 May 2002 to elect members of Fareham Borough Council in Hampshire, England. The whole council was up for election with ward boundary changes since the last election in 2000 reducing the number of seats by 11. The Conservative Party stayed in overall control of the council.

Candidates
All of the seats were contested after the wards had been re-organised. Every ward was contested by the Conservative and Liberal Democrat parties, with Labour standing in every ward but one, and also 1 English Independence Party candidate.

Election result
The results saw the Conservatives remain in control of the council with a reduced majority on 17 seats, compared to 14 for the Liberal Democrats. The Conservatives lost a number of councillors, which they blamed on the boundary changes, while the Liberal Democrats were pleased with the gains they had made. The Liberal Democrat gains also saw the last 2 Labour councillors lose their seats, with the Labour leader Mark Prior losing in Fareham South. Overall turnout was the highest since 1996 at 35.68%.

After the previous election and immediately prior to this election, the composition of the council was:

After the election result, with new wards the composition of the council became:

Ward results

Fareham East

Fareham North

Fareham North West

Fareham South

Fareham West

Hill Head

Locks Heath

Park Gate

Portchester East

Portchester West

Sarisbury

Stubbington

Titchfield

Titchfield Common

Warsash

References

2002
2002 English local elections
2000s in Hampshire